The European School, Luxembourg I was the first of the European Schools. It was founded in October 1953 on the initiative of officials of the European Coal and Steel Community, with the support of the Community's institutions and the government of Luxembourg. In April 1957, it formally became the first of the European Schools. Today it is located on the Kirchberg-Plateau in Luxembourg City.

History

Boulevard de la Foire 
Parents working for the European Coal and Steel Community established the school in 1953. It became necessary to establish a new school when many European children from varying language backgrounds appeared.

When the school was founded it was located on the premises of a former furniture shop in the Limpertsberg quarter of Luxembourg city. It initially had 72 students. The school later moved to Villa Lentz in Hollerich. In 1956 construction began on a new building, located on Boulevard de la Foire, just outside the city centre. The building was opened in 1957, on 11 December. This building today houses the language teaching centre of Luxembourg. The first students graduated in 1959; the graduating class was 23.

At a later date, the school moved to a new site on the Kirchberg plateau, another quarter of Luxembourg city. During the late 80s, the school re-used the building at Boulevard de la Foire, as an overflow school for three age groups of the primary school. Since the end of the 1990s, the old building at Boulevard de la Foire has no longer been used by the European School.

Kirchberg 
The school progressively moved to Kirchberg in the 1990s. At the end of the 1990s, the grounds on Kirchberg were completely redesigned. Old buildings were demolished and new ones (e.g. a new primary school building, an extension of the secondary school building and a new theatre building) were built, though three blocks of the old Secondary school (the current A, B and C blocks) were left standing. T and L blocks were added due to high number of students. In 2012, the school relocated a large portion of students to a second European School of Luxembourg campus, situated in Mamer. 3 years after the separation, it was decided that only T block will be conserved, while L is due to be demolished.

In 2014 the Luxembourgish government signed an agreement for the European Schools to accept 100 more students in their English and French sections.

Students 
As of 1999 the secondary school cycles consisted of three main sections, English, French, and German, each having two classes of students (classes A and B), while the Italian, Spanish, Portuguese, Dutch, and Greek sections only had one class of students per year each. Some students from Scandinavian countries also made up the Danish, Swedish, and Finnish sections, the latter two having been the newest addition to the language sections, just opened in 1995, respectively 1999. Due to their few numbers the students studied their mother tongue under special arrangements, and they shared many other classes such as Philosophy, Geography, History, and Human Science within the sections of their second language, which could be either in English, French, or German. 

Some foreign students were also admitted in very rare cases, from countries that were not in the European Union at that time, but whose parents were working in Luxembourg. These included nationals from Romania, Russia, Turkey, and Bosnia, who were integrated into other language sections.  

In the late 90s, the study of religion in the school was a compulsory subject, but it adhered to the Catholic Church which is the majoritarian religion in Luxembourg. For this reason many students could not opt in, therefore the school introduced the study of Ethics to students of Christian Orthodox, Muslim, Jewish, and other religions.

Guinness World Records 
In 2002, as part of a special program called Science Week that was presented by several teachers of different sciences (physics, biology, and chemistry), Mr. John Watson who holds a Master of Science in Biology, had organized together with the school management and almost 3,000 of its pupils, a giant human DNA in an attempt to receive an entry in the Guinness Book of Records. The DNA which is made up of four simple building blocks called nucleotides, identified by the letters A, T, C, and G, was made with the help of pupils from both primary and secondary school cycles who stepped out in the courtyard, forming two rows facing the opposite direction and extending their right arms towards each other, wearing colored paper cuffs on their forearms, which represented the four letters of the building blocks of the DNA; their left arms resting on the shoulders of the pupils in front of them. 

The world record for the largest human DNA helix was held in 2013 by the Hacettepe University in Turkey, with 3,034 participants, and as of 2016 it is held by the students from the Medical University of Varna in Bulgaria, with 4,000 participants.

Incident 
In the mid 2000s a false bomb alert caused the closure of the school’s premises in the early mornings before the start of the classes. An unprecedented police presence ensued in collaboration with a special forces unit of the Luxembourgish police arriving by helicopter with bomb-sniffing dogs that were used to sniff out the students’ lockers. RTL, Luxembourg’s main TV channel was also quick to arrive on the school grounds. Teachers from the school collaborated with the police in the first hour of their arrival to identify the perpetrator via a recording of his phone call. 

The perpetrator was a student at the school who had used a payphone in downtown Luxembourg to call the school’s administrative office just before the start of his class because he wanted to skip an exam that morning, and because the school did not close immediately thereafter, he then called a local police department to trigger the alarm. It is known that the student was at the very least expelled from the school for a few years.  

Amongst the students, there was widespread criticism about how the Luxembourgish police handled the emergency situation by landing a police helicopter carelessly on a basketball court where primary school pupils were still playing.

Notable alumni 
Eric Everard – founder and CEO of Artexis Group
Marc Hostert – radio personality
Princess Margaretha of Liechtenstein – second daughter of the Grand Duke of Luxembourg
Elizabeth May – Olympic triathlete
Brian Molko – lead singer, songwriter and guitarist of Placebo (transferred prior to graduation)
Henk van der Zwan - Dutch diplomat
Marta Estevez Garcia - Luxembourgish-Spanish international footballer
Lara Heller - British-German-Iranian actress and voice actress
Fleur Maxwell - Luxembourgish former figure skater
Claire Maxwell - sociologist (sister of Fleur Maxwell)

References

External links 
 

Schools in Luxembourg City
Educational institutions established in 1953
Luxembourg
International schools in Luxembourg
1953 establishments in Luxembourg